Chandigarh Amritsar Chandigarh is a 2019 Indian-Punjabi romantic comedy film written by Naresh Kathooria and directed by Karan Guliani. Produced by Sumit Dutt & Dreembook Productions in association with Leostride Entertainment; it stars Gippy Grewal, Sargun Mehta, and Rajpal Yadav in lead roles. It is an official remake of a 2010 Marathi film Mumbai-Pune-Mumbai. The film was released on 24 May 2019.

Cast 

 Gippy Grewal as Rajveer
 Sargun Mehta as Reet 
 Rajpal Yadav as Murari 
 Dilpreet Dhillon as Prince (Reet's boyfriend)

Soundtrack

The album was released on 21 May 2019.

Marketing and release 
Chandigarh Amritsar Chandigarh was released worldwide on 24 May 2019 by Omjee Group. The film clashed with Ammy Virk starrer Muklawa, it was the second major clash in Punjabi cinema after Love Punjab was clashed with Ardaas.

Reception 
Box office 
Chandigarh Amritsar Chandigarh netted ₹51 lakhs on its opening day in India.

References

External links 

 

2019 films
Punjabi-language Indian films
2010s Punjabi-language films
Indian romantic comedy films
Punjabi remakes of Marathi films
2019 romantic comedy films
Films scored by Jatinder Shah